Rajani Chamcharas, the Prince Bidyalongkorn (10 January 1877 - 23 July 1945) was a prince of Thailand. He was a member of the Thai royal family, and was a son of Prince Bowon Wichaichan, and thus a great-grandson of Rama II. His many descendants use the Royal surname Rajani. The Historical Dictionary of Thailand notes:

Tai linguist William J. Gedney called him "probably Thailand's most gifted man of letters of the twentieth century". James N. Mosel, discussing Thai poetry of the early and mid 20th century, notes that:

King Rama VI (Vajiravudh), himself an accomplished author and translator, formed a literary club to promote good writing in Thailand. Bidyalongkorn, a member of the club, formulated a series of rules encouraging correct and concise language, as well as strict observance of classic Thai verse structures. An innovator as well as a traditionalist, he was an influential adopter of novel meters of the chan verse type which, before 1913, had remained unchanged for centuries.

Selected works 
 Vetala Tales (1918?) — a Thai version of the Baital Pachisi, based chiefly on Richard Francis Burton's retelling
 
 
 
 
  — Discussion and excerpts in English

Notes

References

External links 
 Obituary from The Journal of the Siam Society, 36.1 (September 1946)

1877 births
1945 deaths
19th-century Chakri dynasty
20th-century Chakri dynasty
Thai princes
Rajani family
Thai male Phra Ong Chao
People from Bangkok
Members of the Privy Council of Thailand